De Outro Lugar (From Another Place) is the debut album by Brazilian rock band Joana Marte, released on 8 June 2018 and produced by their vocalist and guitarist Rubens Guilhon, who also wrote most of the songs. When the album was already recorded and almost entirely mixed, it was re-recorded and remixed a second time.

The release was preceded by the double single "Inimigos"/"Valsa", released in May; the name of the album is taken from the lyrics of the former.

Song information 
"Pobre Menino" is the oldest song in the album, and the one that had the most versions between the first and the final ones. Its lyrics express the belief that we don't live in a true democracy. "De Ré", created around a guitar riff in drop D, features Renan Chady on vocals since Guilhon wanted "a harsher voice" and "more aggressiveness in the song's sound".

"Novo Lar" is the most recent song and is a tribute to Guilhon's late father. "Retrato de Nós", which made it to the album with a different structure and lyrics than those of its previous versions, features saxophonist Felipe Ricardo. "Lucidez" was created around a jam done by the band and was inspired by works of Josh Klinghoffer and John Frusciante (around that time the current and former guitarists of Red Hot Chili Peppers, respectively; nowadays they have switched places). It features Maria Rosa Lima on vocals. The closing track "Desconexão" is a compilation of "almost entirely unconnected sentences" that actually compose a dialogue that could be between two people of between a person and their own mind.

Track listing

Personnel 
Source:

 Rubens Guilhon — vocals, guitar, production
 Leo Chaves — bass
 João Pedro Normando — keyboard
 Bruno Azevedo — drums

Guest performances 
 Renan Chady — vocals on "De Ré"
 Maria Rosa Lima — vocals on "Lucidez"
 Felipe Ricardo — saxophone on "Retrato de Nós"

Technical personnel 
 Paulo Rosa — recording of drums and parts of the bass
 Kleber Chaar — mastering

Notes

References 

2018 debut albums
Joana Marte albums
Portuguese-language albums